Chrysostomus (meaning "golden mouth" in Greek) may refer to:

Dio Chrysostom  (c. 40 - c. 115 AD),  Greek philosopher, also known as Dion of Prusa
Johannes Chrysostomus Wolfgangus Theophilus Mozart, the baptismal name of composer Wolfgang Amadeus Mozart 
 John Chrysostom (347-407), Early Church Father and Christian saint

See also
Chrysostomos (disambiguation)
Chrysostome (disambiguation)